German submarine U-262 was a Type VIIC U-boat of Nazi Germany's Kriegsmarine during World War II.

The submarine was laid down on 29 May 1941 at the Bremer Vulkan yard at Bremen-Vegesack as yard number 27. She was launched on 10 March 1942 and commissioned on 15 April under the command of Kapitänleutnant Günther Schiebusch.

She was a member of nine wolfpacks, sinking three merchant ships and one warship.

Design
German Type VIIC submarines were preceded by the shorter Type VIIB submarines. U-262 had a displacement of  when at the surface and  while submerged. She had two shafts and two  propellers.

U-262 was fitted with five  torpedo tubes (four fitted at the bow and one at the stern), fourteen torpedoes, one  SK C/35 naval gun, 220 rounds, and two twin  C/30 anti-aircraft guns. The boat had a complement of between forty-four and sixty.

Service history

First and second patrols
Having moved from Kiel in Germany to Bergen in Norway in September 1942, U-262s first patrol was marked by an unsuccessful attack by two Lockheed Hudsons, but the damage inflicted was serious enough to warrant an early return to Bergen.

Her second foray followed the Norwegian coast to Narvik but was otherwise uneventful.

Third patrol
The U-boat sailed from Narvik on 5 November 1942, now under the command of Oberleutnant zur See Heinz Franke, and headed out to the waters east of Newfoundland, sailing first west from Narvik then north, parallel to the eastern Greenland coast; after that turning about, negotiating the Denmark Strait between Greenland and Iceland.

On 18 November, as part of wolfpack Kreuzotter, she attacked the Convoy ONS 144, firing a spread of three torpedoes, one of which hit the Norwegian  , fatally damaging the vessel. The commander ordered the crew to abandon ship, U-262 hit her with another torpedo, breaking the ship in two.

She also sank the 7,178 GRT British cargo ship Ocean Crusader, a straggler from Convoy HX 216 northeast of St. John's on 26 November. U-262 arrived at her new home port of La Pallice on the French Atlantic coast on 9 December 1942.

Fourth patrol
The U-boat departed La Pallice on 16 January 1943 for a patrol out into the mid-Atlantic. There were no survivors.

U-262 returned to La Pallice on 15 February.

Fifth patrol
U-262 sailed again on 27 March 1943 and headed across the Atlantic to Prince Edward Island to pick up German POWs that were to escape from their camp in Operation Elster. On 15 April, while en route, she was shadowing Convoy HX 233, when the U-boat was attacked by depth charges and gunfire from the convoy escorts, forcing her to break off the attack. The U-boat then completed her mission, but no escaped POWs showed up at the rendezvous. She returned to La Pallice on 25 May.

Sixth patrol
U-262 left La Pallice next on 24 July 1943, commanded by the newly promoted Kapitänleutnant Heinz Franke, and headed across the Atlantic. On 8 August U-262 was waiting to refuel from  while  was being supplied, when a Grumman TBF Avenger/Grumman F4F Wildcat team from the aircraft carrier  located the boats and attacked U-262. While attempting to drop depth charges, the Avenger was hit by flak and caught fire, but managed to drop two charges, severely damaging U-262, before ditching into the sea. The Wildcat was also shot down by U-262 during a strafing run. The damage received forced the U-boat to abort her patrol, she returned home on 2 September.

Seventh patrol
The U-boat sailed on 14 October 1943 for the waters northeast of the Azores. There she was involved in attacks on three Allied convoys. On 31 October during the attack on SL 138/MKS 28, she sank the Norwegian 2,968 GRT merchant ship Hallfried. Francke's actions in this patrol were marked by efficient shadowing and determined attacks, for which he was awarded the Knight's Cross of the Iron Cross.

U-262 returned to La Pallice on 7 December.

Eighth and ninth patrol
Under a new commander, Oblt.z.S. Helmut Wieduwilt, U-262 covered the area southwest of Iceland on 3 February 1944, but had no success. She returned home on 29 April after 87 days at sea. U-262s next patrol was similarly uneventful, but lasted only 10 days from 6–15 June. She did not leave the Bay of Biscay. She returned to La Pallice to be fitted with a Schnorchel underwater-breathing apparatus.

Tenth patrol
After an air raid killed three and wounded one of her crew, the U-boat sailed from La Pallice on 23 August 1944, north to the area south of Iceland, before heading east and south through the North Sea to Flensburg, arriving on 5 November after 75 days.

Damage and disposal
While at Gotenhafen (Gdynia, Poland) in December 1944 the U-boat was again damaged by bombing. Struck from the active list at Kiel on 2 April 1945, she was broken up in 1947.

Summary of raiding history

References

Notes

Citations

Bibliography

External links

World War II submarines of Germany
German Type VIIC submarines
U-boats commissioned in 1942
1942 ships
Ships built in Bremen (state)
Maritime incidents in December 1944